Lê Thị Lựu (19 January 1911 – 6 June 1988) was a Vietnamese woman painter. She was one of the first women and rare notable female alumni of Victor Tardieu's École des Beaux-Arts de l’Indochine in Hanoi, becoming the school's first female painter at the age of 16. With Mai Trung Thứ, Lê Phổ and Vũ Cao Đàm she was one of four Vietnamese artists in the 1930s to emigrate to and make a career in Paris.
She used to be a teacher at Bưởi school, where her students included Phan Kế An, who also became a famous painter. During her time in France, she became a prolific art teacher before retiring in 1971.

References

1911 births
1988 deaths
20th-century Vietnamese painters